This is a list of schools in Narita, Chiba Prefecture, Japan.

Prefectural schools
The city has four public high schools operated by the Chiba Prefectural Board of Education.

 
 
 
 Narita Kokusai High School

Municipal schools
The City of Narita Board of Education (成田市教育委員会) operates public elementary and junior high schools.

Municipal combined elementary and junior high schools:

 Shimofusa Midori Gakuen (下総みどり学園)
 Taiei Mirai Gakuen (大栄みらい学園)

Municipal junior high schools:

 Azuma (吾妻中学校)
 Kozunomori (津の杜中学校)
 Kusumi (久住中学校)
 Nakadai (中台中学校)
 Narita (成田中学校)
 Nishi (西中学校)
 Tamatsukuri (玉造中学校)
 Toyama (遠山中学校)

Municipal elementary schools:

 Azuma (吾妻小学校)
 Habu (八生小学校)
 Hashigadai (橋賀台小学校)
 Heisei (平成小学校)
 Honjo (本城小学校)
 Jinguji (神宮寺小学校)
 Karabe (加良部小学校)
 Kouzu (公津小学校)
 Kouzunomori (公津の杜小学校)
 Kuzumi (久住小学校)
 Misatodai (美郷台小学校)
 Mukoudai (向台小学校)
 Nakadai (中台小学校)
 Narita (成田小学校)
 Niiyama (新山小学校)
 Sanrizuka (三里塚小学校)
 Tamatsukuri (玉造小学校)
 Tohyama (遠山小学校)
 Toyosumi (豊住小学校)

Private schools
  (成田高等学校・付属中学校)

See also
 List of high schools in Chiba Prefecture
 List of junior high schools in Chiba Prefecture
 List of elementary schools in Chiba Prefecture

References

Schools in Chiba Prefecture
Narita, Chiba